Nagpur Rural  is a taluka in Nagpur subdivision of Nagpur district of Maharashtra in India.

Cities and towns in Nagpur district
Talukas in Maharashtra
Nagpur district